Lac de Castillon is a reservoir in Alpes-de-Haute-Provence, France. At an elevation of 880 m, the lake's surface area is 5 km². The Castillon dam holds  of water.

Castillon
Landforms of Alpes-de-Haute-Provence